Robert J. Cushman (born 1956) is an American football coach. He is the co-offensive coordinator, quarterbacks coach, and running backs coach at Pasadena City College in Pasadena, California, a position he has held since 2021. Cushman served as the head football coach at Eastern Oregon University from 1997 to 2001, Augustana College in Rock Island, Illinois from 2011 to 2014, the University of Minnesota Morris from 2015 to 2016, and Occidental College from 2017 until the football program's discontinuation in 2020. Cushman was also the head football coach at Feather River College, a community college in Quincy, California, from 2004 to 2006.

Coaching career

Eastern Oregon
Cushman's college head coaching career started in 1997 at Eastern Oregon University after being promoted from defensive coordinator, a position that he had held for ten years. He resigned as the Mountaineers' head coach in 2001 with an 18-31 record.

Feather River
In 2002, Cushman landed his second head coaching job at Feather River College in Quincy, California. He led the Golden Eagles to five consecutive bowl games and a 34–21 overall record. After the 2006 season, Cushman resigned.

Augustana
Cushman went to Augustana College (Illinois) in 2008 to become their defensive coordinator. In 2008, the Vikings' defense under Cushman allowed only 13.4 points per game, ranked seventh in NCAA Division III and first in their conference (CCIW). The Vikings' defense allowed 16.7 points per game in 2009, and 18.8 points per game in 2010.

Cushman was named the Augustana Vikings head coach on November 24, 2010 after four years as defensive coordinator. He resigned on December 2, 2014 with a 17–23 record as the head coach. During his time as the head coach at Augustana, Cushman helped produce five Academic All-Americans, a National Football Foundation Scholar and an NCAA Division III All-American. In addition, 22 Vikings earned all-conference recognition under Cushman.

Minnesota–Morris
On April 1, 2015, Rob Cushman was named the 17th head coach at the University of Minnesota Morris for the Cougars football team.  On October 3, 2015, Cushman lead the Cougars to their first homecoming victory since 2006, a 44–43 win over MacMurray.  After a poor 0–10 finish in 2014, Cushman improved the Cougars football team to a 4–6 record in his first season as their head coach.

Occidental
Cushman was named head football coach at Occidental College on August 1, 2017. His first game came against his alma mater, the University of Puget Sound, on September 9, 2017.

Head coaching record

College

Junior college

References

External links
 Pasadena City profile
 Occidental profile
 Minnesota Morris profile

1956 births
Living people
American football defensive backs
Augustana (Illinois) Vikings football coaches
Chico State Wildcats football coaches
Eastern Oregon Mountaineers football coaches
Ithaca Bombers football coaches
Minnesota Morris Cougars football coaches
Occidental Tigers football coaches
Pasadena City Lancers football coaches
Puget Sound Loggers football players
High school football coaches in California